The China Association for International Friendly Contact (CAIFC) is a United Front organization subordinate to the Liaison Bureau of the Political Work Department of the Central Military Commission. CAIFC was founded in 1984 and is active in overseas influence operations to promote the interests of the Chinese Communist Party (CCP). 

According to a 2018 report by the United States-China Economic and Security Review Commission, CAIFC "performs dual roles of intelligence collection and conducting propaganda and perception management campaigns." The reported added, "CAIFC has additional ties to the Ministries of State Security, Civil Affairs, and Foreign Affairs, and it is a platform for deploying undercover intelligence gatherers. In addition to sending intelligence collectors abroad, CAIFC sponsors trips to China by foreign military and veteran groups, businesspeople, and former politicians which typically include contact with hand-picked PLA personnel."

CAIFC's chairman is Chen Yuan who replaced Li Zhaoxing. CAIFC operates an affiliated think tank called the Center for Peace and Development Studies.

History 
Scholar Anne-Marie Brady stated that CAIFC traditionally "interacted with a wider range of groups" than did the Chinese People's Association for Friendship with Foreign Countries and had close links to Deng Xiaoping. CAIFC's vice president is Deng Rong, a daughter of Deng Xiaoping.

CAIFC has hosted forums with prominent executives and political leaders such as Bill Gates, Tony Blair, John Howard, and Malcolm McCusker. The organization has maintained cooperative relationships with private Chinese companies such as CEFC China Energy and its former head Ye Jianming. In June 2020, it was reported that CAIFC had provided financial support to the Rajiv Gandhi Foundation.

Sanya Initiative 
Since 2008, CAIFC has partnered with the EastWest Institute and Tung Chee-hwa's China-United States Exchange Foundation (CUSEF) to organize forums, termed the U.S.-China Sanya Initiative, between retired People's Liberation Army officers and retired U.S. military personnel. CAIFC was reported to have unsuccessfully attempted to influence retired U.S. military officers, including retired admiral William Owens, to lobby against U.S. arms sales to Taiwan and to delay a Pentagon report on the capabilities of the People's Liberation Army.

See also 

 Chinese intelligence activity abroad
Chinese information operations and information warfare
Political warfare

References

External links 
 

People's Liberation Army General Political Department
1984 establishments in China
Chinese propaganda organisations
People's Republic of China friendship associations
Organizations associated with the Chinese Communist Party
Chinese intelligence agencies
Disinformation operations
Information operations units and formations
United front (China)